The Social Democratic Party of Russia (SDPR; ; Sotsial-demokraticheskaya partiya Rossii, SDPR) was a political party founded in Russia by Mikhail Gorbachev on November 26, 2001. The first name of the party was Social Democratic Party of Russia (United).

History
The Social Democratic Party of Russia was a coalition of several social democratic parties, had approximately 12,000 members, but had no seats in the Russian State Duma. Gorbachev resigned as party leader in May 2004 over a disagreement with party chairman Konstantin Titov who had insisted, over Gorbachev's opposition, on a deal with the pro-Kremlin United Russia Party in the previous year's general election.

Konstantin Titov, in turn, announced his resignation at the 3rd convention of the party held September 4, 2004. The convention elected the new chairman, Vladimir Kishenin, leader of the Party of Social Justice, who was favoured by Titov.

Presenting himself, Kishenin mentioned that he studied in a KGB college in 1972-1975. When asked why he was a trusted representative for Vladimir Putin during the last presidential election, Kishenin explained that this was done at the request of Vladislav Surkov, deputy director of the President's Administration.

On April 13, 2007, the party lost its official status due to its small membership. The vast majority of the party's base has regrouped under the banner of Union of Social-Democrats, a new party organized and led by Mikhail Gorbachev, founded on October 20, 2007.

Youth organization 

Youth organization of Social Democratic Party of Russia is Russian Social-Democratic Union of Youth (RSDUY, Russian: Российский социал-демократический союз молодёжи). RSDUY was founded in 2000 and have official status. RSDUY is an observer of International Union of Socialist Youth.

See also
 Union of Social-Democrats
 Politics of Russia

References

External links

translation of the Social Democratic Party of Russia Official Website
translation of the Novye Izvestia article on the 3rd convention.
 Russia Bans Party Founded by Gorbachev], mosnews.com, April 13, 2007

2001 establishments in Russia
2007 disestablishments in Russia
Defunct socialist parties in Russia
Mikhail Gorbachev
Political parties disestablished in 2007
Political parties established in 2001
Social democratic parties in Russia